The Train is a 1964 war film directed by John Frankenheimer and starring Burt Lancaster, Paul Scofield and Jeanne Moreau. The picture's screenplay—written by Franklin Coen, Frank Davis, and Walter Bernstein—is loosely based on the non-fiction book Le front de l'art by Rose Valland, who documented the works of art placed in storage that had been looted by the Nazi Germany from museums and private art collections. Arthur Penn was The Train original director, but was replaced by Frankenheimer three days after filming had begun.

Set in August 1944 during World War II, it pits French Resistance-member Paul Labiche (Lancaster) against German Colonel Franz von Waldheim (Scofield), who is attempting to move stolen art masterpieces by train to Germany. Inspiration for the scenes of the train's interception came from the real-life events surrounding train No. 40,044 as it was seized and examined by Lt. Alexandre Rosenberg of the Free French forces outside Paris.

Plot
In August 1944, masterpieces of modern art stolen by the Wehrmacht are being shipped to Germany; the officer in charge of the operation, Colonel Franz von Waldheim, is determined to take the paintings to Germany, no matter the cost. After the works selected by Waldheim are removed from the Jeu de Paume Museum, curator Mademoiselle Villard seeks help from the French Resistance. Given the imminent liberation of Paris by the Allies, SNCF (French National Railways) workers associated with the Resistance need only delay the train for a few days, but it is a dangerous operation and must be done in a way that does not risk damaging the priceless cargo.

Resistance cell leader and SNCF area inspector Paul Labiche initially rejects the plan, telling Mlle. Villard and senior Resistance leader Spinet, "I won't waste lives on paintings." He has a change of heart after a cantankerous elderly engineer, Papa Boule, is executed for trying to sabotage the train on his own. After that sacrifice, Labiche joins his Resistance teammates Didont and Pesquet, who have been organizing their own plan with the help of other SNCF Resistance members. In an elaborate ruse, they reroute the train, temporarily changing railway station signage to make the German escort believe they are heading to Germany when they have actually turned back toward Paris. Two deliberate collisions then block the train in at the small town of Rive-Reine without risking the cargo. Labiche, although shot in the leg, escapes on foot with the help of Christine, the widowed owner of a Rive-Reine hotel, while other Resistance members involved in the plot are executed, including Pesquet.

That night, Labiche and Didont meet Spinet again, along with young Robert (the nephew of Jacques, the executed Rive-Reine station master) and plan to paint the tops of three wagons white to warn off Allied aircraft from bombing the art train. Robert recruits railroad workers and friends of his Uncle Jacques from nearby Montmirail. Robert and Didont are both seen painting the train cars and killed, but because of the paint the train is spared from bombing.

Now working alone, Labiche continues to delay the train after the tracks are cleared, to the mounting rage of von Waldheim. Labiche attempts to use plastic explosives to destroy the locomotive, only to find French hostages placed on the locomotive by the Germans, so he blows the explosives early. The tracks in front of the train are damaged, but the train stops just before rolling over them. While the Germans fix the tracks, Labiche runs ahead, struggling to keep away from the soldiers searching for him. Finally, he manages to derail the train by removing rail spikes and loosening the rails when the train passes over them, resulting in it falling between the rails, into the gravel. Von Waldheim flags down an army convoy retreating on a nearby road, and learns that a French armored division is not far behind. The colonel orders the train unloaded and attempts to commandeer the trucks for the art, but the convoy's commander refuses the order. The train's small German contingent then kills the hostages and joins the retreating convoy.

Von Waldheim remains behind with the abandoned train. Strewn everywhere between the track and the road are crates labeled with the names of famous artists. Labiche appears and the colonel castigates him for having no real interest in the art he has saved: "You couldn't tell me why you did what you did." In response, Labiche turns and looks at the murdered hostages and then, without a word, turns back to von Waldheim and shoots him dead. Afterwards Labiche limps away, leaving the corpses and the art treasures where they lie.

Cast
Sourced to the American Film Institute.

 Burt Lancaster as Paul Labiche
 Paul Scofield as Colonel Franz von Waldheim
 Jeanne Moreau as Christine
 Suzanne Flon as Miss Villard
 Michel Simon as Papa Boule
 Wolfgang Preiss as Major Herren
 Albert Rémy as Didont
 Charles Millot as Pesquet
 Jean Bouchard as Hauptmann Schmidt
 Richard Münch as General von Lubitz
 Jacques Marin as Jacques 
 Paul Bonifas as Spinet
 Donald O'Brien as Sergeant Schwartz
 Arthur Brauss as Lieutenant Pilzer
 Bernard La Jarrige as Bernard 
 Daniel Lecourtois as Priest
 Gérard Buhr as Corporal
 Howard Vernon as Hauptmann Dietrich
 Nick Dimitri as German soldier
 Christian Fuin as Robert 
 Christian Rémy as Tauber 
 Helmo Kindermann as Ordnance officer
 Jacques Blot as Hubert
 Jean-Claude Bercq as Major
 Jean-Jacques Lecomte as Lieutenant of retreating convoy
 Jean-Pierre Zola as Octave
 Louis Falavigna as Railroad worker
 Max From as Gestapo officer
 Richard Bailey as Grote
 Roger Lumont as Engineer officer

Historical background
The Train is based on the factual 1961 book Le front de l'art by Rose Valland, the art historian at the Jeu de Paume, who documented the works of art placed in storage there that had been looted by the Germans from museums and private art collections throughout France and were being sorted for shipment to Germany in World War II.

In contrast to the action and drama depicted in the film, the shipment of art that the Germans were attempting to take out of Paris on August 1, 1944, was held up by the French Resistance with an endless barrage of paperwork and red tape and made it no farther than a railyard a few miles outside Paris.

The train's actual interception was inspired by the real-life events surrounding train No. 40,044 as it was seized and examined by Lt. Alexandre Rosenberg of the Free French forces outside Paris in August 1944. Upon his soldiers' opening the wagon doors, he viewed many plundered pieces of art that had once been displayed in the home of his father, the Parisian art dealer Paul Rosenberg, one of the world's major Modern art dealers.

Artworks seen in the film's opening scenes prominently include paintings that in reality were not looted by the Germans such as When Will You Marry? by Paul Gauguin and Girl with a Mandolin by Pablo Picasso.

Production

Frankenheimer inherited the film from another director, Arthur Penn. Lancaster fired Penn after three days of filming in France, and asked Frankenheimer to assume the role of director. Penn envisioned a more intimate film that would muse on the role art played in Lancaster's character, and why he would risk his life to save the country's great art from the Nazis. He did not intend to give much focus to the mechanics of the train operation itself. But Lancaster wanted more emphasis on action to ensure that the film would be a hit, after the failure of his film The Leopard. The production was shut down briefly while the script was rewritten, and the budget doubled. As he recounts in the Champlin book, Frankenheimer used the production's desperation to his advantage in negotiations. He demanded and was given the following: his name was made part of the title, "John Frankenheimer's The Train"; the French co-director, demanded by French tax laws, was not allowed to ever set foot on set; he was given total final cut; and a Ferrari. Much of the film was shot on location.

The Train contains multiple real train wrecks. The Allied bombing of a rail yard was accomplished with real dynamite, as the French rail authority needed to enlarge the track gauge. This can be observed by the shockwaves travelling through the ground during the action sequence. Producers realized after filming that the story needed another action scene and reassembled some of the cast for a Spitfire attack scene that was inserted into the first third of the film. French Armée de l'Air Douglas A-26 Invaders are also seen later in the film.

The film includes a number of sequences involving long tracking shots and wide-angle lenses, with deep focus photography. Noteworthy tracking shots include:

 Labiche attempting to flag down a train, then sliding down a ladder, running along the tracks and jumping onto the moving locomotive— performed by Lancaster himself, not a stunt double.
 A scene in which the camera wanders around Nazi offices that are hastily being cleared, eventually focusing on von Waldheim and following him back through the office.
 A long dolly shot of von Waldheim travelling through a marshalling yard at high speed in a motorcycle sidecar.
 Labiche rolling down a mountain and across a road, and staggering down to the track. Frankenheimer noted on his DVD commentary that Lancaster performed the entire roll down the mountain himself, filmed by cameras at points along the hillside.

During an interview with the History Channel, Frankenheimer revealed:
 The marshalling yard attacked during the Allied bombing raid sequence was demolished by special arrangement with the French railway, which had been wanting to do it but had lacked funding.
 The sequence in which Labiche is shot and wounded by German soldiers while fleeing across a pedestrian bridge was necessitated by a knee injury that Lancaster suffered during filming - he stepped in a hole while playing golf, spraining his knee so severely that he could not walk without limping.
 When told that Michel Simon would be unable to complete scenes scripted for his character as a result of prior contractual obligations, Frankenheimer devised the sequence wherein Papa Boule is executed by the Germans. Jacques Marin's character was killed for similar reasons.
 Colonel von Waldheim (Scofield) is told, at the scene of the last major train wreck, by Major Herren (Wolfgang Preiss), "This is a hell of a mess you've got here, Colonel." This line became a metaphor for complicating disasters on Frankenheimer films thereafter.
 Colonel von Waldheim was originally to engage Labiche in a shootout at the film's climax, but after Scofield was cast in the role, at Lancaster's suggestion, Frankenheimer re-wrote the scene to provide Scofield a more suitable end, taunting Labiche into killing him.

In The Train Blu-Ray, it features commentary by John Frankenheimer himself which revealed: 
 The museum interior shots was actually a set.
 They used about 20 230B locomotives in the movie.
 When they had to do a run-by shot, they had to back the train 5 miles to get it up to speed. Each take took about 1 hour and half to do.
 The Vaires bombing scene was assisted by Charles de Gaulle's son, Philippe de Gaulle. It took them about a third of a year to get it all set up.
 The explosions of the freight wagons, the switch tower, and the armored engine were actually real. The armored engine was a 230B shrouded just for it to be blown up on camera.
 The crew during the Vaires bombing scene were in a bunker about 500 feet away from the explosions.
 When the youth, Robert, is shot and falls off the roof of the Rive-Reine station, that was actually Burt Lancaster falling.
 The film started production in summer 1963 and even though it was August, John Frankhenheimer remembered that it was quite cold. 
 The original director, Arthur Penn, wanted the film to be more about the paintings themselves. Burt Lancaster disagreed with this, and John Frankenheimer was hired to replace Penn. 
 Burt Lancaster (Labiche), Albert Remy (Didont), and Charles Millot (Pesquet) all learned how to drive the 230B locomotives, and Lancaster also learned how to set off a plastique bomb. Frankenheimer noted that Lancaster took his time to learn things. 
 The locomotive that derailed at Rive-Reine (where the big head-on wreck happened) was actually moving much faster than it was supposed to be moving. The actor shots were done as an afterthought, but the stuntman apparently got carried away, causing one camera to be mere millimeters from the train wheels, not to mention many cameras were destroyed in that scene. Each of those cameras cost $50,000 in 1964 money, around $465,000 today.
 When the British planes flew over the train at Rive-Reine (because the first three cars were painted white on their roofs), they were about 30 to 40 feet off the ground.
 The Spitfire chase scene was actually done as an afterthought, and when the locomotive entered the tunnel it was moving at about 70 mph. When it hit the locomotive at Rive-Reine, it was moving at about 60 mph, and everybody thought it was going to charge into the town.
 The WW2 vehicles used in the final segment for the evacuation of the troops on the train were overwhelmingly more than 20 years old. Allied equipment was mostly used to depict the German heavy military equipment, like tanks and trucks (i.e. several M24 Chaffees served for German battle tanks loaded on a train, and two M8 Greyhound escorted a German army column in the movie's final scenes).

Frankenheimer remarked on the DVD commentary, "Incidentally, I think this was the last big action picture ever made in black and white, and I am personally so grateful that it was filmed in black and white. I think the black and white adds tremendously to the movie."

Throughout the film, Frankenheimer often juxtaposed the value of art with the value of human life. A brief montage ends the film, intercutting the crates full of paintings with the dead bodies of the French hostages, before a final shot shows Labiche walking away down the road.

Locations
Filming took place in several locations, including: Acquigny (Calvados; Saint-Ouen, Seine-Saint-Denis; and Vaires, Seine-et-Marne. The shots span from Paris to Metz. Much of the film is centred in the fictional town called "Rive-Reine".

'Circular journey'

Actual train route: Paris, Vaires, Rive-Reine, Montmirail, Chalon-S-Marne, St Menehould, Verdun, Metz, Pont-à-Mousson, Sorcy (Level Crossing), Commercy, Vitry Le Francois, Rive-Reine.

Planned route from Metz to Germany: Remilly, Teting (level crossing), Saint Avold, Zweibrücken.

Locomotives used

The chief locomotives used were examples of the former Chemins de fer de l'Est Series 11s 4-6-0, which the SNCF classified as 1-230-B. 1-230.B.517 was specified as Papa Boule's locomotive and features particularly prominently, flanked by sister locomotives 1-230.B.739 and 1-230.B.855. A decommissioned locomotive doubled as the 517 for the crash scene (a production still of the aftermath from the rear shows the tender identification number reading 1-230.B.754), and another was given a plywood armoured casing to depict a German Army locomotive for the yard manoeuvres-and-raid scene. An ancient "Bourbonnais" type 030.C 0-6-0 (N° 757), apparently decommissioned by SNCF, was deliberately wrecked to block the line; it moved faster than the film crew anticipated and smashed three of the five cameras placed near to the track in the process. Other engines of various classes can be seen on background sidings in the run-by scenes and in aerial views of the yard, among them SNCF Class 141R 2-8-2 engines, which were not supplied to France until after the war as part of the railway's reconstruction, as well as USATC S100 Class 0-6-0T tank engines, designated by the SNCF as 030TU, which were used by the approaching Allied forces.

Reception
The Train earned $3 million in the US and $6 million elsewhere. It had cost $6.7 million. The film was one of the 13 most popular films in the UK in 1965.

Awards and nominations

See also
 The Monuments Men
 The Battle of the Rails

References
Notes

Bibliography
 Armstrong, Stephen B. Pictures About Extremes: The Films of John Frankenheimer. Jefferson, North Carolina: McFarland, 2007. .
 Balio, Tino. United Artists: The Company That Changed the Film Industry. Madison, Wisconsin: University of Wisconsin Press, 1987. .
 Buford, Kate. Burt Lancaster: An American Life. New York: Da Capo, 2000. .
 Champlin, Charles, ed. John Frankenheimer: A Conversation With Charles Champlin. Bristol, UK: Riverwood Press, 1995. .
 Evans, Alun. Brassey's Guide to War Films. Dulles, Virginia: Potomac Books Inc., 2000. .
 Pratley, Gerald. The Cinema of John Frankenheimer (The International Film Guide Series). New York: Zwemmer/Barnes, 1969.

External links

1960s war adventure films
1964 films
French war drama films
American black-and-white films
1960s English-language films
English-language French films
Films scored by Maurice Jarre
Films about the French Resistance
Films based on non-fiction books
Films directed by John Frankenheimer
Films set in 1944
Films set in Paris
Films set on trains
United Artists films
American war adventure films
Western Front of World War II films
World War II films based on actual events
Films with screenplays by Walter Bernstein
1960s American films
American war drama films